Cars Toons is a television series of American computer-animated short films produced by Pixar. It features the main characters Lightning McQueen and Mater from Pixar's Cars franchise non-canonically in the original plot. Larry the Cable Guy reprises his role as Mater while Keith Ferguson replaces Owen Wilson as the voice of Lightning McQueen until The Radiator Springs 500 ½, when Wilson reprises his role.

The series premiered on October 27, 2008 on both Disney Channel, Toon Disney and ABC Family. Not exclusive to television, the shorts were also released on home media and/or as theatrical shorts. The series ended on May 20, 2014 with The Radiator Springs 500 ½ being the final short to be made.

Premise

Mater's Tall Tales
All Cars Toons in Mater's Tall Tales follow a shared formula: Each episode opens with Mater popping out of his garage door and declaring, "If I'm lyin', I'm cryin'!" (or a variation thereof as seen on the home media and television releases) before cutting to the episode's title card.

Each episode then properly begins with Lightning McQueen and Mater seeing something that results in the latter proceeding to tell the former a tall tale about something he supposedly did in the past, before the action shifts to the flashback of Mater's story. At a midway point, the action briefly shifts back to Mater and McQueen in which the former proclaims that the latter was also involved by saying, "Don't you remember? You was there too!" (or also some other variation thereof). The flashback then resumes with McQueen's sudden and usually unwilling participation in the story's events. After Mater finishes telling his tall tale (with the exception of Tokyo Mater), McQueen denies the fact that Mater's tale is real and Mater replies, "Well, suit yourself!" (or also some variation thereof) before one or more characters/elements involved in the story coincidentally appear to McQueen's shock, paradoxically suggesting that Mater's story really happened.

Each episode ends with Mater and McQueen posing in their corresponding story's costumes, with the exception of Tokyo Mater and Time Travel Mater. All episodes also feature Mia and Tia and various pit crew forklifts in supporting roles (with the exception of Time Travel Mater).

Tales from Radiator Springs 
All Cars Toons in Tales from Radiator Springs simply follow the comedic antics and adventures of McQueen, Mater and their friends in their hometown Radiator Springs, following the events of Cars 2.

Voice cast

 Larry the Cable Guy as Mater
 Keith Ferguson (2008–2013) / Owen Wilson (2014) as Lightning McQueen
 George Carlin (2009, archive recordings) / Lloyd Sherr (2013–2014) as Fillmore
 Tony Shalhoub as Luigi
 Guido Quaroni as Guido
 Michael Wallis as Sheriff
 Katherine Helmond as Lizzie
 Lindsey Collins as Mia
 Elissa Knight as Tia
 Jerome Ranft as Red (only in Tales from Radiator Springs)

Production
After the success of Cars, production of Cars Toons: Mater's Tall Tales began in 2006. The first nine shorts were produced by Pixar, while all the following shorts were produced by Pixar's subsidiary, Pixar Canada.

"Tokyo Mater" premiered in theaters in the US with Bolt on December 12, 2008. The short is the first Disney·Pixar production presented in Disney Digital 3-D. However, the DVD release features a different short, Super Rhino. Sulley and Mike from the 2001 film Monsters, Inc. (also made by Pixar) make cameo appearances in "Tokyo Mater" as their car forms from the ending of the first film.

Release

Merchandise
It was announced that Cars Toons: Mater's Tall Tales was to be released as part of the Disney·Pixar Cars Die-Cast Line in mid-2009. In October 2009, they released several die-casts. They released all of the "Rescue Squad Mater" and "Mater the Greater" die-casts, and they are working on "El Materdor" die-casts and reverse.

Video game
A video game based on the series also titled Cars Toon: Mater's Tall Tales and developed by Papaya Studio, was released on October 19, 2010 for the Wii. A PC version was also released outside the United States and on Steam worldwide in 2014.

Home media
A DVD and Blu-ray compilation of the first nine shorts, titled Cars Toons: Mater's Tall Tales, was released on October 31, 2010. The compilation includes "Mater the Greater", "Rescue Squad Mater", "Monster Truck Mater", "Unidentified Flying Mater", "El Materdor", "Moon Mater", "Heavy Metal Mater", "Mater Private Eye" and "Tokyo Mater", with Moon Mater and Mater Private Eye created exclusively for this set. Choosing the "Play All" option from the menu gives each short (except for Mater the Greater which plays first) unique intros.

The remaining two episodes of Mater's Tall Tales, "Air Mater" and "Time Travel Mater" were released on the Pixar Short Film Collection, Volume 2. And the three episodes of Tales from Radiator Springs, "Hiccups", "Bugged" and "Spinning" were released on YouTube. The remaining episode of Tales from Radiator Springs, "The Radiator Springs 500 ½" was released on the Pixar Short Films Collection, Volume 3.

Future
In addition to "The Radiator Springs 500 ½," which was released in 2014, director Rob Gibbs revealed at the 2013 Disney D23 Expo a fifth Cars Toons: Tales from Radiator Springs episode titled "To Protect and Serve." The short was expected to debut in 2014 on Disney Channel, but to date this has not occurred.

Episodes

Mater's Tall Tales (2008–12)

Tales from Radiator Springs (2013–14)

Characters

Mater's Tall Tales

Tales from Radiator Springs

 Note: A grey cell indicates the character was not in the episode.

References

External links
 
 Mater's Tall Tales on Disney website
 
 
 

Cars (franchise)
Pixar short films
2008 American television series debuts
2014 American television series endings
2000s American animated television series
2010s American animated television series
American children's animated comedy television series
American animated television spin-offs
Animated television shows based on films
English-language television shows
Television series by Disney
Television series based on Disney films
Television series by Pixar
Disney animated television series
American computer-animated television series
Animated television series about auto racing
Short films directed by John Lasseter